George Walbridge Perkins II (May 2, 1895 – January 11, 1960) was an American diplomat who served as Assistant Secretary of State for European Affairs from 1949 to 1953 and as United States Permanent Representative to NATO from 1955 to 1957.

Life and career
He was born on May 2, 1895, to George Walbridge Perkins. He graduated from Princeton in 1917, where he worked to abolish eating clubs. In 1921 he married Linn Merck, daughter of George W. Merck. In 1925 his son George Walbridge Perkins III (1925–2008) was born. He worked at Merck & Co., Inc. from 1927 to 1948. In 1950, he successfully persuaded Congress to assist Josip Broz Tito in his defiance of the Stalin regime. Perkins died of a heart attack in Manhattan on January 11, 1960.

See also
Glynwood Center

References

External links
George Walbridge Perkins Jr. papers at Columbia University
George Walbridge Perkins (1895-1960) via US Department of State

1895 births
1960 deaths
Permanent Representatives of the United States to NATO
Princeton University alumni